Anders Kristiansen may refer to:

 Anders Kristiansen (businessman) (born 1967), Danish businessman
 Anders Kristiansen (badminton) (born 1979), Danish badminton player
 Anders Kristiansen (footballer) (born 1990), Norwegian footballer